Katrin Leumann is a Swiss cross-country mountain biker. She has twice competed for Switzerland at the Summer Olympics.  In 2004, she finished in 19th place, a feat she repeated at the 2012 Summer Olympics.

She has won the MTB European Championships in Haifa for ECh MTB in Elite Women category with total time of 01:47:26 Hours.

References

External links

Cross-country mountain bikers
Swiss female cyclists
1982 births
Living people
Olympic cyclists of Switzerland
Cyclists at the 2004 Summer Olympics
Cyclists at the 2012 Summer Olympics
Sportspeople from Basel-Stadt